Jean Cortot (14 February 1925, in Alexandria, Egypt - 28 December 2018 in Paris, France), was a French painter, poet and illustrator.

Biography
A student of Othon Friesz, Corton was part of the Scale group which, from 1943 onwards was established with Jacques Busse, Calmettes, Patrix, Geneviève Asse and others. At that time Corton was awarded the "Prix de la Jeune Peinture" followed, in 1954, by the "Menton Union Prize for Mediterranean Modern Art".

Cortot is a distinguished graphic artist and has illustrated numerous books, achieving a notable symbiosis between writing and painting.

Notable works by Cortot include his variations of studies in the shipyard of La Ciotat (1947-1950), the landscape of the Ardèche, Still Life (1955-1956), variations on his Cities Series (1957-1958), his Antiques (1962) and his Combat Series (1967, which follows that of the Scriptures). From 1974 he produced his series of poem-pictures.

He has also produced several tapestries, and has also made several frescoes.

Cortot was elected member of the French Academy of Fine Arts on 26 November 2001.

Significance
Cuban art critic Severo Sarduy has said of Cortot, in the introduction to his Inscription and intention: "While the conceptual history of writing in the West is vast, its graphic history remains extremely poor. The concern for elegance in the stroke, for the projection of the line, for curves and flourishes, we assigned to the civilizations of ideograms and arabesques, leaving our script with a purely informative role, a role devoid of ornament, script reduced to its austere legibility .... and it is precisely in its contradiction thereof that Jean Cortot's work derived its singularity."

References

External links
 "Jean Cortot, painter and poet: Member of the Academy of Fine Arts" at canalacademie.com (in French)
 JEAN CORTOT, PAINTED WRITING at lesfilmsduhorla.com/

20th-century French painters
20th-century French male artists
French male painters
21st-century French painters
21st-century French male artists
French illustrators
1925 births
2018 deaths
French poets
Members of the Académie des beaux-arts
French male poets
French expatriates in Egypt